The Shizuoka Derby is a commonly occurring football fixture in Japan. The game  takes place between the two professional J. League teams in Shizuoka Prefecture; Shimizu S-Pulse and Júbilo Iwata. The game is usually hosted at Ecopa Stadium, the prefecture's largest sporting venue. In the two 2007 J-League season meetings, S-Pulse triumphed both times. Firstly 2–1 at Nihondaira Stadium in May, and then 1–0 in September at Ecopa.

The Shizuoka Derby's rivalry factors include: the common prefecture (historically, Shizuoka Prefecture was divided into three provinces, Suruga Province, Tōtōmi Province and Izu Province; Shimizu would represent Suruga and Iwata would represent Tōtōmi); and the fact that Júbilo supporters feel that Shimizu should not have been chosen for the J. League as it had not competed in the Japan Soccer League beforehand (whereas the old Yamaha Motor Corporation club that preceded Júbilo had gone all the way to the old title).

Complete Record of Competitive Matches

League
Record: 22 wins for Júbilo, 15 wins for S-Pulse and 4 draws.

Cups
Shimizu S-Pulse：5–0–4
Júbilo Iwata：4–0–5

1999 J. League Championship, Júbilo went 1–1 total with S-Pulse and won the match with a golden goal in extra time.

External links
Photos of Iwata supporters, with several anti-Shimizu signs, by the Progresso firm.

 
Shimizu S-Pulse
Japan football derbies